Petko Dragiev (born 14 April 1965) is a Bulgarian volleyball player. He competed in the men's tournament at the 1988 Summer Olympics.

References

1965 births
Living people
Bulgarian men's volleyball players
Olympic volleyball players of Bulgaria
Volleyball players at the 1988 Summer Olympics
Sportspeople from Plovdiv